Shlomo Sztencl (pronounced Shtentzel) (1884 – 1919) was a Polish Orthodox Jewish rabbi. He served as Chief Rabbi of Czeladź, Poland and Rav, dayan, and rosh yeshiva of Sosnowiec, Poland. He is the author of Koheles Shlomo and Beis Shlomo, the former published posthumously.

Family background
Sztencl was born on 16 August 1884 (25 Av 5644) in Czeladź, Poland to Chaim Dov (Berish) Sztencl of Czeladź, a Radomsker hasidic rabbi. 

Sztencl had one brother, the Yiddish poet Avraham Nochum, and two sisters, Esther and Tsime.

Biography

In 1897, several months before his bar mitzvah, Shlomo traveled to Berzeznitz to study with its Chief Rabbi, Yaakov Yosef HaCohen Rabinovitch, author of Emes LeYaakov. Several months later, when Rabinovitch was appointed Chief Rabbi of Klabotsk, he took Sztencl with him. After for a year and a half, Shlomo returned to the yeshiva of Amstov to study for another year. In the winter of 5661 (1900–1901), he studied with Avrohom Bornsztain for six months. In the summer of 1901 he returned home to Czeladź.

Several days after his eighteenth birthday in 1902, Sztencl married Miriam Bayla, daughter of Rabbi Efraim Mordechai Mottel Zweigenhaft. Following his marriage, Sztencl began writing a diary, in which he kept a cheshbon hanefesh (lit. "soul-reckoning"), which was discovered only after his death.

At the age of 21 Sztencl became rabbi of Czeladź. Four years later he moved to Sosnowiec and was appointed rabbi and dayan (religious judge). He also led a yeshiva.
 
Sztencl died on August 31, 1919 (5 Elul 5679) at the age of 35.

Family

Sztencl is the father of Yonah Sztencl and of Ester (1913-1943), the wife of Shlomo Zev Zweigenhaft.

Works
Sztencl's father collected and prepared his son's writings for publication. The manuscript was then divided into two books: Koheles Shlomo and Beis Shlomo. The former was published in 1932 and reprinted in 1973 by his Israeli descendants. In 2013 Beis Shlomo was published for the first time in one volume together with Koheles Shlomo in Jerusalem. The book was entitled Chidushei Hagaon M'sosnovitz (Novelle of the Genius of Sosnowiec).

References

External links
One of his books at Wikisource

1884 births
1919 deaths
Hasidic rosh yeshivas
20th-century Polish rabbis
Polish Orthodox rabbis
People from Czeladź
People from Sosnowiec